A Besti squat is a figure skating move. It is similar to the spread eagle in that the skater travels along an edge with both skates on the ice, the toes turned out to the sides and the heels facing each other. The knees are bent outwards into a squatting position with the thighs held parallel to the ice and the torso kept upright.
In ballet terminology, it is a plié with the feet in second position.

The move is unofficially named after Natalia Bestemianova, who performed the move repeatedly in her 1988 free dance with Andrei Bukin.

References
 

Figure skating elements
Partial squatting position